Rich Kids were a short-lived new wave band from London, founded in 1977 by Glen Matlock following his departure from the Sex Pistols. The band also included future Ultravox member Midge Ure and Rusty Egan, who both later founded Visage together. They released one album and three singles during their existence, from March 1977 to December 1978 (although the official announcement of their disbanding was not made until mid-1979).

Rich Kids were amongst the foremost British exponents of the power pop style, blending influences from 1960s acts such as Small Faces and The Who with more recent punk rock sounds. With only one single making the Top 40 in the UK Singles Chart,

Career
Rich Kids were formed in 1977 by bass player Glen Matlock after he left Sex Pistols. An early line-up consisted of keyboardist and guitar player Bill Smyth, Rusty Egan on drums, Steve New on lead guitar, and The Clash's Mick Jones, who acted as a session live player. Glaswegian Midge Ure, whose band Slik had split up and reformed as the punk sounding PVC2, moved to London and joined Rich Kids. Smyth left the group followed by Jones, who continued with The Clash.

Rich Kids recorded their first set of radio sessions on 1 October 1977 for the 7 November broadcast of BBC Radio 1, hosted by DJ John Peel. Following on 13 January 1978, they were ranked at #24 on 4 February UK Charts with their first self-titled single "Rich Kids". This caught more attention from the BBC, who invited them to perform on Top of the Pops and several more sets for the short-lived live music TV series Revolver hosted by Peter Cook.

On 22 March, they recorded a further session for John Peel's 3 April broadcast. Another single, "Marching Men" was released on 19 May as means to promote the release of their album produced by Mick Ronson. Despite taping a video promo for Donnie Sutherland and After Dark, the song did not chart. At their Lyceum show in spring 1978, Ronson played guitar and Ian McLagan (ex-Faces) played keyboards. Several of the band's performances were featured in the 1980 film D.O.A..

Matlock and New later played with Sid Vicious in the band Vicious White Kids, which only played one concert.

The Rich Kids released the album   Ghosts of Princes in Towers, and the single of the same name, in August, with the latter ranking only at #51. Their last TV appearance was at the University of Reading where they taped a live show for Rock Goes to College on 27 October. But the band ran into creative differences as they recorded demos for a second album. Having acquired a synthesiser, Ure, alongside bandmate Egan, wanted to integrate the new instrument into the band's sound while Matlock and New preferred to remain with traditional guitars and drums. This resulted in the group's decision to go their separate ways.

Matlock and New went on to tour with Iggy Pop, while Egan and Ure formed a band called The Misfits (not the American horror punk band Misfits) and, after short spells with Skids and Thin Lizzy, respectively, reunited in Visage. In April 1979, Ure joined Ultravox.

On 7 January 2010, the band played a one-off reunion concert at The O2 Academy Islington, London in aid of Steve New. New died from cancer on 24 May 2010.

In February 2016, it was announced that Rich Kids, with Gary Kemp on lead guitar and James Hallawell on keyboard, would reform for a joint headline show with The Professionals at London's O2 Shepherd's Bush Empire for 16 May. The show was rescheduled for 23 June due to the ongoing structural work at the venue.

The band reunited for a one-off appearance at the Vive Le Rock awards at The O2 Academy Islington, London on 27 March 2019, with Neal X of Sigue Sigue Sputnik standing in on lead guitar.

Personnel
Midge Ure − lead vocals, rhythm guitar, keyboards (1977–1979, 2010, 2016, 2019)
Glen Matlock − bass, lead and backing vocals (1977–1979, 2010, 2016, 2019)
Rusty Egan − drums (1977–1979, 2010, 2016, 2019)
Steve New − lead guitar, keyboards, backing vocals (1977–1979, 2010; their death)
Mick Jones − guitar, backing vocals (1977)
Bill Smyth − keyboard (1977)

Guest musicians 
Gary Kemp – lead guitar (2016)
Neal X – lead guitar (2019)

Timeline

Discography
Studio albums
1978 – Ghosts of Princes in Towers (EMI, August 1978) No. 51
Singles
1978 – "Rich Kids" b/w "Empty Words" (EMI, January 1978) No. 24  (also released on red vinyl.)
1978 – "Marching Men" b/w "Here Comes the Nice (live)" (EMI, March 1978)
1978 – "Ghosts of Princes in Towers" b/w "Only Arsenic" (EMI, August 1978)
Compilations
1998 – Burning Sounds compilation. (Rev-Ola, September 1998)
2003 – Best of The Rich Kids compilation. (EMI, July 2003)

See also
D.O.A. (1980 film)
List of Peel sessions
List of British punk bands
List of performers on Top of the Pops
Timeline of punk rock

References

External links 
 Rich Kids on Myspace
 The Rich Kids on Myspace
Final Rich Kids concert, and photos

English new wave musical groups
English punk rock groups
English power pop groups
Musical groups from London
Sex Pistols
EMI Records artists
Musical groups established in 1977
Musical groups disestablished in 1979